Barehipani Falls is a two tiered waterfall located in Simlipal National Park in Mayurbhanj district in the Indian state of Odisha. It is one of the highest waterfalls in India.

Location
The waterfall is situated at 21.932759N 86.380145E on the Budhabalanga River flowing over Meghasuni mountain of the Eastern Ghats. The nearest railway station is at Baripada. The Joranda Falls is located nearby.
It is 120 km from the town of Jashipur.

The falls
It is a tiered waterfall with two drops. it is the  second  highest water fall in India and the highest  water fall in Odisha.

See also
List of waterfalls in India
List of waterfalls in India by height

References 

Waterfalls of Odisha
Mayurbhanj district
Eastern Ghats